Dundalk Institute of Technology (DkIT) is an institute of technology, located in Dundalk, Ireland. Established as the Dundalk Regional Technical College, students were first enrolled in the college in 1971 and it was later re-defined as an institute of technology in January 1998.

As of 2019, the institute has 4,509 students and is equipped with 497 full-time staff.

History

Dundalk Regional Technical College (1966–1997) 
Dundalk Institute of Technology began as Dundalk Regional Technical College. An institute in Dundalk was first envisioned in the Steering Committee on Technical Education Report in 1966, speaking on Dundalk in particular they stated:We consider that the Regional Colleges fall into three groups … (iii) the other five centres where it has been decided to establish Regional Technical Colleges. We anticipated that the last group would probably not grow industrially as rapidly as group (ii) [Waterford and Galway] although Dundalk and Carlow appeared to us to have greater immediate potential than the other centres in the same group.The building programme for the regional colleges commenced in 1968, with Dundalk Regional Technical College opening their doors in September 1969, officially opening in 1971. In the late 1990s, all of the technical colleges in the country were redefined as institutes of technology. Dundalk Regional Technical College adopted the name Dundalk Institute of Technology on 28 January 1998.

Institute of Technology status (1997–present) 
DkIT's PJ Carroll Building was a building acquired by the Department of Education in 2002 for €16.8m, the building was previously owned by PJ Carroll Tobacco Factory. The architecture firm Scott Tallon Walker were tasked with renovating the building for the college, they were chosen as they originally helped design the building in 1967. Refurbishment and development began in 2005, after partial development, plumbing and electrical trades workshops were relocated into the PJ Carroll Building within a year, along with a digital media editing suite.

By 2010, their refurbishment was completed and the School of Informatics and Creative Arts were also relocated into the PJ Carroll Building. The building officially opened on the 11 February 2011 by the Taoiseach at the time, Brian Cowen. Cowen then stated that:"For Ireland to achieve its full potential we need a strong skills pool and institutes such as Dundalk (Institute of Technology) are of central importance in equipping people with the skills needed to create and seize emerging opportunities."Despite being officially opened, the building retains large sections from the original building untouched since the acquisition from PJ Carroll's Tobacco Factory. These areas are not open to students, this encompasses a large section of the former factory and a mezzanine room. The PJ Carroll building is on the Louth County Council's Record of Protected Structures.

In 2005, DkIT opened their new Nursing Building, the glass-fronted building cost €15.5 million and covers 4,000 square meters. This building is the hub for Nursing and Health studies for the college and accommodates over 400 students on a four-year course. The building's facilities include; three clinical labs with a six-bedded ward, a sensory garden, laboratories and an intensive care ward, equipped with dummies.

On 2 October 2020, DkIT established a steering committee aimed to meet the criteria of meeting "Technological University" (TU) status. , DkIT announced plans to join an existing TU. The proposal, while not yet formal, has been supported by the Higher Education Authority. , DkIT was looking at a merger with an existing TU.

Structure

Schools

The institute has four schools, with each one consisting of a number of departments with a wide range of programmes on offer. Additionally, the Lifelong Learning Centre offers many part-time study options and there are also many apprenticeship options on offer, through the School of Engineering.

The four schools at DkIT are:

 School of Business and Humanities
 Department of Business Studies
 Department of Humanities
 Department of Management and Financial Studies
 Section of Hospitality Studies
 School of Engineering
 Department of Civil and Environmental Engineering
 Department of Construction and Surveying
 Department of Electronic and Mechanical Engineering
 School of Informatics and Creative Arts
 Department of Computing and Mathematics
Department of Visual and Human Centred Computing
 Department of Creative Arts, Media and Music
 School of Health and Science
 Department of Applied Sciences
 Department of Nursing, Midwifery and Health Studies
 Section of Midwifery

The previous presidents/directors/principals have been Dr Seán McDonagh (1971-2001), Denis Murphy (acting 1997–1999), Gerry Carroll (acting 2000–2001), Dr Tom Collins (2001-2005), Denis Cummins (2005–2016) and Ann Campell (acting 2016–2017) and Dr Michael Mulvey (2017-2022)  The chairman of the Board of Governors as of 2020 is Patrick W. Malone, he succeeded Andrew Griffith and Joanna Gardiner.

Lifelong Learning Centre 

The Lifelong Learning Centre at Dundalk Institute of Technology is a "resource for the whole community of the Northeast". It 
offers services to help people with career and skills development. The range of academic and other learning opportunities includes a number of courses.

With the recent economic climate, the Lifelong Learning Centre has had a huge increase in applications for night classes.

Regional Development Centre 

Established in 1989 by DkIT, the Regional Development Centre acts as the institute's Innovation Support and Technology Transfer organisation. The centre acts as a commercially oriented interface between DkIT and the industrial, commercial and business life of the region, and makes available the expertise, facilities and resources of the institute for the wider benefit of the regional economy.

Through the Research and Developmental endeavours of its Academic Staff, DkIT has developed an applied R&D reputation in Software Development, Electronics and Engineering Design, Applied Humanities, Cultural Studies and Enterprise Development & Innovation with a new and emerging area in the field of Renewable Energy and Digital Media.

The DkIT Regional Development Centre has been awarded the ISO 9001-2000 Quality Standard.

Library 

The library at DkIT Institute of Technology (DkIT) is located in the Whitaker building. The facility provides learning and research support to 5,000 + students and staff with 400 study spaces, over 50,000 books and journals and access to a range of online databases.

There are 100 PCs for project and research work as well as wireless internet access on two floors. The library's collection is mainly academic to support DkIT's undergraduate and postgraduate programmes. There is also a fiction collection as well as films on DVD and music CDs.

The library building was named after T. K. Whitaker, in recognition of his contribution to the Irish economy. Books donated by him are available for consultation in the TK Whitaker collection. The library was renamed the de Chastelain library in 2019. This was in honour of the retired General John de Chastelain for his involvement in the Northern Ireland Peace Process.

Research 

The Sunday Times Higher Education analysis places the institute as the top research income performer in the IoT sector.

Researchers within the institute carry out internationally recognised research within several key thematic areas from across its four academic schools. These thematic areas include Ageing and Health, Informatics and the Environment, Creative Media, Music and Entrepreneurship.

DkIT is home to the Ion Channel Biotechnology Centre (ICBC). The ICBC is an Applied Research Enhancement Centre established by core funding from Enterprise Ireland. It is one of three ARE Centres in the Bio Life Sciences and Pharmaceutical cluster. The other two ARE Centres in this cluster include the Shannon Applied Biotechnology Centre based in the Institute of Technology, Tralee and Limerick Institute of Technology and the Pharmaceutical & Molecular Biotechnology Research Centre (PMBRC), based in Waterford Institute of Technology.

Irish language 
The institute's "Irish Language Scheme", the first of a series of three-year schemes under Acht na dTeangacha Oifigiúla (The Official Languages Act) 2003, came into effect on 18 October 2010. The institute established Oifig na Gaeilge to aid in the implementation of the scheme and to coordinate a range of activities promoting the use of the Irish language within the institute. This office opened on a part-time basis at the start of 2011 and is based in the PJ Carroll Building.

References 

Buildings and structures in Dundalk
Educational institutions established in 1970
Education in County Louth
Universities and colleges in the Republic of Ireland
Institutes of technology in the Republic of Ireland